Parc de Lacroix-Laval or Domaine de Lacroix-Laval is a park in the commune of Marcy-l'Étoile, Lyon Metropolis, France. Opened to the public in 1985 it lies entirely within the limits of Marcy-l'Étoile but borders the communes of Charbonnières-les-Bains and la Tour-de-Salvagny.

Design & features 
The park encompasses  of partially wooded land.  and "The National Institute of Labor, Employment and Vocational Training" (or INTEFP) are located inside the park.

The park became part of the Lyon Metropolis on 1 January 2015.

See also 
 Parks in Lyon

References

External links 

 
 Virtual tour of Parc de Lacroix-Laval

Parks in Lyon
Marcy-l'Étoile
1985 establishments in France